Williamsburg Township is one of the fourteen townships of Clermont County, Ohio, United States. The 2010 census reported 5,746 people living in the township, 3,256 of whom lived in the unincorporated portions of the township.

Geography
Located in the eastern part of the county, it borders the following townships:
Jackson Township - north
Sterling Township, Brown County - northeast
Pike Township, Brown County - east
Clark Township, Brown County - southeast corner
Tate Township - south
Batavia Township - west

The village of Williamsburg is located in eastern Williamsburg Township.

Name and history
It is the only Williamsburg Township statewide.

Government
The township is governed by a three-member board of trustees, who are elected in November of odd-numbered years to a four-year term beginning on the following January 1. Two are elected in the year after the presidential election and one is elected in the year before it. There is also an elected township fiscal officer, who serves a four-year term beginning on April 1 of the year after the election, which is held in November of the year before the presidential election. Vacancies in the fiscal officership or on the board of trustees are filled by the remaining trustees.

References

External links
Township website
County website

Townships in Clermont County, Ohio